The A-flat (A) clarinet is a member of the clarinet family, smaller than and sounding a perfect fourth higher than the E clarinet and a minor seventh higher than the B clarinet. As a transposing instrument, it sounds a minor sixth higher than written, thus its lowest note, E, sounds as concert middle C.

The A is rare, but more common than other obsolete instruments in high C, B, and A (an octave above the more common instruments in those keys) listed by Shackleton. Some writers call the A and these other instruments octave clarinets, sopranino clarinets, or piccolo clarinets.  The boundary between the octave and soprano clarinets is not well-defined, and the rare instruments in G and F might be considered as either. Shackleton, along with many early twentieth-century composers, uses the term "piccolo clarinet" to refer to the E and D clarinets as well (piccolo merely meaning "small" in Italian).  This designation is less common today, with the E and D instruments more usually designated soprano clarinets. The term "piccolo clarinet" is used by some recent music software  (e.g., MuseScore and Finale) for the A clarinet.

Clarinets pitched in A appeared frequently in European wind bands, particularly in Spain and Italy, at least through the middle of the 20th century, and are called for in the stage-band parts for several operas by Verdi.

Cecil Forsyth associated the high instruments with Austria saying, "Clarinets in (high) F, and even in (high) A are occasionally used abroad.  The latter instrument is regularly employed in the Austrian military bands."  A famous example of extensive use of a high clarinet in a Viennese small ensemble was the Schrammel quartet, consisting of two violins (the brothers Johann and Josef Schrammel), a contraguitar, and G clarinet, played by Georg Dänzer, during the 1880s.

The A clarinet is not uncommon in clarinet choir arrangements—for instance, those of Lucien Cailliet, including Mozart's Marriage of Figaro overture—though the instrument is often optional or cued in other voices.  There are parts for A clarinet in Béla Bartók's Scherzo for Piano and Orchestra, op. 2 ("mostly in unison with the E or piccolo [flute]") and in John Tavener's Celtic Requiem (1969).  Several chamber works of Hans-Joachim Hespos employ the A clarinet,
including the wild go which also features soprano sarrusophone, heckelphone, and tárogató.  Hespos also uses the A clarinet in the orchestral work Interactions. Matthijs Vermeulen's Symphony Nr. 4 has a part for A clarinet.

At least four manufacturers currently produce A clarinets: L. A. Ripamonti (featured in the pictures),  Orsi Instruments, Seggelke Klarinetten and Buffet Crampon. Leblanc had produced A clarinets prior to their acquisition by Conn-Selmer in 2004, but has since ceased production.  Ripamonti produces both German and French system (including Full Boehm) A clarinets.  Schwenk and Seggelke make German system clarinets in A and high G.

Contemporary works for A clarinet

 Samuel Andreyev – Verifications
 Hans-Joachim Hespos – Interactions

References

Bibliography

External links
Seggelke Klarinetten home page

Clarinets
A-flat instruments